Peter Nissen may refer to:

 Peter L. Nissen (born 1924), Norwegian aviator and businessman
 Peter Norman Nissen (1871–1930), Canadian-American-British mining engineer, inventor and army officer